Green Stadium is a multi-purpose stadium in Awendo, Kenya.  It used mostly for football matches and is the home stadium of Sony Sugar.  The stadium holds 5,000 people.

Football venues in Kenya
Sport in Nyanza Province
Multi-purpose stadiums in Kenya
SoNy Sugar F.C.